Louis J. Sylvester (February 14, 1855 – May 5, 1936), was a Major League Baseball player who played outfielder from -. He would play for the Cincinnati Outlaw Reds, Cincinnati Red Stockings, Louisville Colonels, and St. Louis Browns.

External links

1855 births
1936 deaths
Major League Baseball outfielders
Cincinnati Outlaw Reds players
Cincinnati Red Stockings (AA) players
Louisville Colonels players
St. Louis Browns (AA) players
19th-century baseball players
Augusta Browns players
Memphis Reds players
Milwaukee Cream Citys players
Sacramento Altas players
Oakland Colonels players
Sacramento Senators players
San Antonio Missionaries players
Houston Mudcats players
Baseball players from Illinois
Burials at the Cemetery of the Evergreens